Mayerthorpe Airport  is located  southwest of Mayerthorpe, Alberta, Canada.

References

Registered aerodromes in Alberta
Lac Ste. Anne County